August Männikson (1889–?) was an Estonian politician. He was a member of II Riigikogu. He was a member of the Riigikogu since 20 December 1924. He replaced Juhan Maksim. On 31 December 1924, he resigned his position and he was replaced by Arnold Ehrstein.

References

1889 births
Year of death missing
Workers' United Front politicians
Members of the Riigikogu, 1923–1926